Jung Joon-ho (born October 1, 1970) is a South Korean actor, who gained fame in the 2000 series, Women Like You, (왕추). His recent hits are Last Scandal (내 생애 마지막 스캔들) and IRIS. Jung Jun-ho has a passionate interest in singing. In Last Scandal aired on MBC, Jung sang his character's theme song.

Jung's performance in Last Scandal earned him the title as one of the top excellent actors of 2008. His acting again gained recognition in 2009's hit drama, IRIS. He was crowned as one of the excellent actors.

In 2019, he starred in a hit drama Sky Castle.

Career
Jung Jun-ho started his acting career at 1995. He never thought of entering the entertainment industry and becoming an actor. He admitted that when he was a kid, he was shy and would cry when his teacher placed him in front of the class to sing. After enlisting in the military, he often hosted events. He began to realize his talent - acting. He joined MBC station training class at 1995. Although he worked with many famous stars like Lee Young-ae during the first few years of his acting career, the movies and series he made in the first few years did not lend him much limelight; he remained in obscurity. Feeling discouraged, he had thoughts of retiring from the entertainment industry. After all, he considered himself as an introvert. His personality might not be suitable as an actor.

In 2000, he landed a role in television series, Women Like You (왕추). The series propelled him to stardom. At the same year, he was cast in My Boss, My Hero. To his surprise, the movie not only received high box office record but also solidified his star power. Due to his success with his comedic role in My Boss, My Hero, he was cast in many more comedic roles in series and movies between 2002 and 2006. All of them were pretty successful. His comedic image was deeply engraved in fans' mind. However, he felt typecast and hoped for a change of image and a breakthrough in his career. He questioned himself which career route he wished to head down and which new image he wanted to develop.

In 2005, a director suggested him to play a villain in Another Public Enemy. His performance stunned his fans and the media. They never knew that Jung Jun-ho could play a villainous side. The positive remarks he received from his fans and media boosted his confidence in his acting. In 2008 and 2009, he gave outstanding performances in Last Scandal and IRIS. He hopes to take on more exotic roles in his upcoming series and movies that will give audiences a fresh feeling every time they see him onscreen.

Personal life
Jung Jun-ho has an older sister and two younger brothers.

On March 25, 2011, he married MBC announcer Lee Ha-jung. They met in November 2010 when she interviewed him on the set of his drama Queen of Reversals. They have 2 children: son Si-wook (born 2014) and daughter (born 2019).

Filmography

Television
 From Now on, Showtime! (MBC, 2022)
True Beauty (tvN, 2020–2021)
The Tale of Nokdu (KBS2, 2019)
Sky Castle (jTBC, 2018)
The Flower in Prison (MBC, 2016)
Sweet, Savage Family (MBC, 2015)
Mama (MBC, 2014)
Your Neighbor's Wife (jTBC, 2013)
Queen of Reversals (MBC, 2010)
IRIS (KBS2, 2009)
Last Scandal (MBC, 2008)
Perhaps Love (Mnet, 2007)
Princess Lulu (SBS, 2005)
Hotelier (MBC, 2001) (cameo)
Air Force (MBC, 2000)
Women Like You (MBC, 2000)
Mr. Duke (MBC, 2000) (cameo)
Goodbye My Love (MBC, 1999)
Love (MBC, 1998)
Sunflower (MBC, 1998)
Condition of Love (MBC, 1997)
Cinderella (MBC, 1997)
The Fourth Republic (MBC, 1995)

Film
 Ghost Police (TBA) 
The Fisherman as Jong-beom (2022) 
Hitman: Agent Jun (2020)
Operation Chromite (2016)
Return of the Mafia (2012)
George and Bong-sik (2010, unreleased)
Love, In Between (2010)
More Than Blue (2009) (cameo)
City of Damnation (2009)
Swindler in My Mom's House (2007)
West 32nd (2007) (cameo)
Righteous Ties (2006)
My Boss, My Teacher (2005)
The Twins (2005)
Another Public Enemy (2005)
Marrying the Mafia II (2005) (cameo)
A Wacky Switch (2004)
North Korean Guys (2003)
The Legend of the Evil Lake (2003)
Unborn But Forgotten (2002)
Marrying the Mafia (2002)
A Perfect Match (2002)
My Boss, My Hero (2001)
The Last Witness (2001)
The Siren (2000)
Anarchists (2000)
1818 (1997)

Television Show 
 Wife's Taste (2018–2021), - Regular Member, (episode 1–144)
 Long live and work (2020) - MC, (episode 1–12)
 Star Golf Big League (2021) - Cast Member
 Oh Eun-young Game (2023) - judge

Ambassadorship 
 Anti-Fraud Ambassador Charter (2022)

Awards
2014 34th Golden Cinema Festival: Most Popular Actor (Return of the Mafia)
2010 MBC Drama Awards: Top Excellence Award, Actor (Queen of Reversals) 
2009 17th Chunsa Film Art Awards: Korean Cultural Award
2009 KBS Drama Awards: Excellence Award, Actor in a Mid-length Drama (IRIS) 
2008 MBC Drama Awards: Top Excellence Award, Actor (Last Scandal) 
2007 Kyung Hee University: Achievement Award 
2005 28th Hwanggeum Film Awards: Best Actor 
2002 23rd Blue Dragon Film Awards: Popular Star Award (Marrying the Mafia) 
1996 MBC Drama Awards: Best New Actor

State honors

Notes

References

External links
 
 
 Jung Joon-ho at Daum 
 

South Korean male film actors
South Korean male television actors
1970 births
Living people